William Wade Hampton (1854–1928) was one of the first attorneys in Gainesville, Florida.  He and his brother Edwin moved to Gainesville from Tampa, Florida in 1875.  Wade and his brother Edwin founded the town's first paper, the Gainesville Times in 1876.  This paper later became The Gainesville Sun.

Wade and his brother Edwin founded the town's first law firm, Hampton and Hampton and he was the first president of the Florida Bar. Wade was the first of three generations of Wade Hamptons who practiced law in Gainesville from 1875 until 2006.

Wade Hampton was a leader in the efforts to bring the University of Florida to Gainesville in 1906.

Wade and his wife Minna Jordan Hampton lived in a house in the Northeast Historic district of Gainesville, but it was torn down in the 1970s.  His son's house (Wm Wade Hampton jr) is one of the oldest in the Gainesville Northeast Historic District.

1854 births
1928 deaths
Florida lawyers
19th-century American lawyers